Squashsite (referring to squashsite.co.uk) is a sport website that provides squash news, results, squash tournament coverage. Squashsite is owned and co-founded by Steve Cubbins and Framboise Gommendy. Individual users can use an RSS reader to be automatically notified of updates on this site and other newsfeeds, and other websites can also 'subscribe' to the newsfeed to provide their users with the latest squash headlines. Squashsite is also available in French.

Financial troubles

In 5 years time, they managed to produce an annual income of £20,000 through sponsors and official tournament website fees.  They were not able to receive subsistence from the three main bodies: the World Squash Federation (WSF), the Professional Squash Association (PSA) and the Women's International Squash Players Association (WISPA). A meeting was set up in Manchester with the Cardiff-based PSA, the men's tour body, to discuss a potential partnership, however, a last-minute change from the governing body left it with no alternative but to quit the site.

Mick Dodd, James Willstrop's manager, had given Cubbins & Gommendy a lifeline by suggesting that they should carry on serving the squash community and leave the business side up to him.

See also
 World Open Squash

References

External links 
 Squashsite Official Website
 Sitesquash: Squashsite French Website
 World Open Squash Website By Squashsite

Squash websites